Custard is a variety of culinary preparations based on sweetened milk, cheese, or cream cooked with egg or egg yolk to thicken it, and sometimes also flour, corn starch, or gelatin. Depending on the recipe, custard may vary in consistency from a thin pouring sauce (crème anglaise) to the thick pastry cream (crème pâtissière) used to fill éclairs. The most common custards are used in custard desserts or dessert sauces and typically include sugar and vanilla; however, savory custards are also found, e.g., in quiche. 

Custard is usually cooked in a double boiler (bain-marie), or heated very gently in a saucepan on a stove, though custard can also be steamed, baked in the oven with or without a water bath, or even cooked in a pressure cooker. Custard preparation is a delicate operation, because a temperature increase of 3–6 °C (5–10 °F) leads to overcooking and curdling. Generally, a fully cooked custard should not exceed 80 °C (~175 °F); it begins setting at 70 °C (~160 °F). A water bath slows heat transfer and makes it easier to remove the custard from the oven before it curdles. Adding a small amount of cornflour to the egg-sugar mixture stabilises the resulting custard, allowing it to be cooked in a single pan as well as in a double-boiler. A sous-vide water bath may be used to precisely control temperature.

Chemistry 
Stirred custard is thickened by coagulation of egg protein, while the same gives baked custard its gel structure. The type of milk used also impacts the result. Most important to a successful stirred custard is to avoid excessive heat that will cause over-coagulation and syneresis that will result in a curdled custard.

Eggs contain the proteins necessary for the gel structure to form, and emulsifiers to maintain the structure. Egg yolk also contains enzymes like amylase, which can break down added starch. This enzyme activity contributes to the overall thinning of custard in the mouth. Egg yolk lecithin also helps to maintain the milk-egg interface. The proteins in egg whites set at 60–80 °C (140–180 °F).

Starch is sometimes added to custard to prevent premature curdling. The starch acts as a heat buffer in the mixture: as they hydrate, they absorb heat and help maintain a constant rate of heat transfer. Starches also make for a smoother texture and thicker mouth feel.

If the mixture pH is 9 or higher, the gel is too hard; if it is below 5, the gel structure has difficulty forming because protonation prevents the formation of covalent bonds.

Custard variations 

While custard may refer to a wide variety of thickened dishes, technically (and in French cookery) the word custard (crème or more precisely crème moulée) refers only to an egg-thickened custard.

When starch is added, the result is called pastry cream or confectioners' custard, made with a combination of milk or cream, egg yolks, fine sugar, flour or some other starch, and usually a flavoring such as vanilla, chocolate, or lemon. Crème pâtissière is a key ingredient in many French desserts, including mille-feuille (or Napoleons) and filled tarts. It is also used in Italian pastry and sometimes in Boston cream pie. The thickening of the custard is caused by the combination of egg and starch. Corn flour or flour thicken at 100 °C (212˚F) and as such many recipes instruct the pastry cream to be boiled. In a traditional custard such as a crème anglaise, where egg is used alone as a thickener, boiling results in the over cooking and subsequent 'curdling' of the custard; however, in a pastry cream, starch prevents this. Once cooled, the amount of starch in pastry cream 'sets' the cream and requires it to be beaten or whipped before use.

When gelatin is added, it is known as crème anglaise collée. When gelatin is added and whipped cream is folded in, and it sets in a mold, it is bavarois. When starch is used alone as a thickener (without eggs), the result is a blancmange. In the United Kingdom, custard has various traditional recipes some thickened principally with cornflour (cornstarch) rather than the egg component, others involving regular flour; see custard powder.

After the custard has thickened, it may be mixed with other ingredients: mixed with stiffly beaten egg whites and gelatin, it is chiboust cream; mixed with whipped cream, it is crème légère, .  Beating in softened butter produces German buttercream or crème mousseline.

A quiche is a savoury custard tart. Some kinds of timbale or vegetable loaf are made of a custard base mixed with chopped savoury ingredients. Custard royale is a thick custard cut into decorative shapes and used to garnish soup, stew or broth. In German, it is known as Eierstich and is used as a garnish in German Wedding Soup (Hochzeitssuppe). Chawanmushi is a Japanese savoury custard, steamed and served in a small bowl or on a saucer. Chinese steamed egg is a similar but larger savoury egg dish. Bougatsa is a Greek breakfast pastry whose sweet version consists of semolina custard filling between layers of phyllo.

Custard may also be used as a top layer in gratins, such as the South African bobotie and many Balkan versions of moussaka.

In Peru, leche asada ("baked milk") is custard baked in individual molds. It is considered a restaurant dish.

Summary of variations in French cuisine 
French cuisine has several named variations on custard:
 Crème anglaise is a light custard made with eggs, sugar, milk and vanilla (with the possible addition of starch), with other flavoring agents as desired
 With cream instead of milk, and more sugar, it is the basis of crème brûlée
 With egg yolks and heavy cream, it is the basis of ice cream
 With egg yolks and whipped cream, and stabilised with gelatin, it is the basis of Bavarian cream
 Thickened with butter, chocolate or gelatin, it is a popular basis for a crémeux
 Crème pâtissière (pastry cream) is similar to crème anglaise, but thickened with flour
 With added flavoring or fresh fruit, it is the basis of crème plombières
 Crème Saint-Honoré is crème pâtissière enriched with whipped egg whites
 Crème chiboust  is similar to crème Saint-Honoré, but stabilised with gelatin

 Crème diplomate and crème légère are variations of crème pâtissière enriched with whipped cream
 Crème mousseline is a variation of crème pâtissière enriched with butter
 Frangipane is crème pâtissière mixed with powdered macarons or almond powder

Uses 

Recipes involving sweet custard are listed in the custard dessert category, and include:

 Banana custard
 Bavarian cream
 Boston cream pie
 Bougatsa
 Chiboust cream
 Cream pie
 Crème caramel
 Cremeschnitte
 Custard tart 
 Danish pastry
 Egg tart
 Eggnog
 English trifle
 Flan
 Floating island
 Frangipane, with almonds
 Frozen custard
 Fruit Salad
 Galaktoboureko
 Muhallebi
 Natillas
 Pastel de nata
 Pudding
 Taiyaki
 Vanilla slice
 Vla
 Zabaglione

Physical-chemical properties 

Cooked (set) custard is a weak gel, viscous and thixotropic; while it does become easier to stir the more it is manipulated, it does not, unlike many other thixotropic liquids, recover its lost viscosity over time. On the other hand, a suspension of uncooked imitation custard powder (starch) in water, with the proper proportions, has the opposite rheological property: it is negative thixotropic, or dilatant, allowing the demonstration of "walking on custard".

History 

Custards baked in pastry (custard tarts) were very popular in the Middle Ages, and are the origin of the English word 'custard': the French term croustade originally referred to the crust of a tart, and is derived from the Italian word crostata, and ultimately the Latin .

Examples include Crustardes of flessh and Crustade, in the 14th century English collection The Forme of Cury. These recipes include solid ingredients such as meat, fish, and fruit bound by the custard. Stirred custards cooked in pots are also found under the names Creme Boylede and Creme boiled. Some custards especially in the Elizabethan era used marigold (calendula) to give the custard color.

In modern times, the name 'custard' is sometimes applied to starch-thickened preparations like blancmange and Bird's Custard powder.

See also 

 
 
 List of custard desserts
 List of desserts

References

External links 
 

British desserts
Dairy products
English cuisine
Food ingredients
Steamed foods
American desserts
Independence Day (United States) foods
Types of food